Carl-Emil Lohmann (born 31 August 2001) is a Danish actor, dancer, singer and voice artist from Lejre, Lejre Municipality. He performed as the 84th Billy Elliot in Billy Elliot the Musical in Denmark at Det Ny Teater in Copenhagen.

Early life and education
Carl-Emil Lohmann was born to Lars Mathias Lohmann and Isabell Line Lohmann on 31 August 2001 in Lejre, Lejre Municipality. He has an older sister Sofie Lohmann who is also a theater actress.

He started his education from Allerslev Skole a local school, Lejre, Denmark but through the 6th grade he took a break to focus on his role as Billy Elliot in Billy Elliot the Musical, afterward he transferred to Trekroner Frinet Skole, Valby, Denmark.

Career
He started to show interest in theater from early age and started theater with his sister Sofie Lohmann by attending performing arts school named Scene Kunst Skoler in Roskilde, Denmark from the age of seven. Since then he starred in six musical theater shows including: Love Never Dies (As Gustave), Evita (As Fredrich), Billy Elliott (As Billy Elliot), Sound of Music, Jekyl & Hyde and Annie Get Your Gun (As Little Jake) at Det Ny Teater, Copenhagen, Denmark. He also appeared in the Backgammon as young Erik in 2014.

Carl started attending Anne Rosing Institute in Hellerup, Denmark to enhance his singing techniques and piano playing skills. He credited partially singing Sommer og Sol in Beauty and the Beast (da) and singing O Hellige Nat (O Holy Night) as a part of TV2 Alletiders Juleshow with Aalborg Symphony Orchestra at Musikkens Hus, recorded for TV2.

Lohmann performed as dubbing artist (from 2015) in nineteen different Danish animation and Animation series like: Kubo, Bunk’d, Dyrene i Hakkebakkeskoven, Find Dory, Løvernes Garde (da), Miles Fra Morgendagen and Ronja Røverdatter.

References

External links
Carl-Emil Lohmann on Danish Film Institute

Living people
2001 births
People from Lejre Municipality
Danish male voice actors
Danish male  dancers
21st-century Danish  male singers
21st-century Danish dancers